The Order of Musashi Shinobi Samurai is a Japanese shinobisamurai clan which served Tokugawa Ieyasu and the Edo Shogunate from 1582 to 1868.  They served the Tokugawa Shogunate as intelligence operatives called onmitsu (undercover agents), and metsuke (inspectors), and in the 19th century, as diplomats.  When the political system changed due to the restoration of the monarchy in 1868, it became independent. The order consists of a number of families and people who have built close relations of trust with the Shibata Clan of the Musashi Province.

The clan was closed for over 450 years and kept its arts hidden, but turned to open its door to the public in 2006. It has become an NPO and now engaged in introducing the ninja and samurai cultures of the Clan Shibata, as well as in the advocacy of its philosophy, now termed Ninshido which was developed by their ancestors under the shogunate.

The definition of "shinobisamurai"
According to the First Chapter of Mansenshukai (Bansenshukai) authored by Fujibayashi Sabuji Yasutake in 1676, there were two types of shinobi, namely shinobisamurai and shinobinomono. The shinobisamurai were samurai who trained their peasants and the locals to work as shinobinomono and contracted for shinobi services from feudal lords. The shinobinomono didn't have warrior backgrounds. The two Japanese characters used by the author for the term "shinobisamurai" (忍士) can be also read "ninshi".

In the order, the term "shinobisamurai" refers to the samurai who used to engage in shinobi activities during the Warring State Period. And after 1600, those who served the Shogunate are referred to as "ninshi".

The shinobijutsu (ninjutsu) of the order

The traditional understanding of shinobijutsu (ninjutsu) in the order is that it is not a martial art but a collection of strategic techniques to collect intelligence without being noticed. The shinobi arts handed down in the order are: the clan martial arts, weapon crafting, performing arts, equestrian arts, shinobi medicine, explosives and language education. Thus each member chooses his/her art(s) to focus on. As shinobi's missions are to gather information that shinobi do not need to be martial artists. There are variety of shinobi classes, namely, bugei(martial arts)-shinobi, gigei(performing arts)-shinobi, tokumu(special duty)-shinobi, etc. depending on the expertise of the shinobi.

The ideology of the order

The ideology of the organization is termed "Kyohmei" (共鳴) spirit, and its ninpo is called "Gorin ninpo" (五輪忍法). Ninpo is a fundamental philosophy to indicate how techniques should be applied. The teamwork guideline is expressed by four characters: "Lin fuh lai in" (林風雷陰(隠) signifying "Act quietly and fast, get results instantly without being noticed." Guidelines, systems, and methods are taught for each shinobi member to gradually shift his/her expertise of jutsu (art) to one based on Do (Way).

History
The order has a shinobisamurai origin. The history of the order goes back to the mid-16th century.

On 4 June 1582, right after Honnō-ji Incident, the clan ancestors, Shibata Suwo and Nagamochi Tokuzo, escorted Tokugawa Ieyasu by the request from Ieyasu's retainer, Hattori Hanzo. Together with other Iga and Koka shinobi, they guarded Ieyasu to Ise where Ieyasu and his retainers boarded a ship and eventually arrived at the Okazaki Castle in Mie successfully. 
Since then the Igamono shinobisamurai started to serve Ieyasu, and the Shibata-Nagamochi clan officially became retainers of Tokugawa Ieyasu in 1582.
They moved to Edo (in Musashi region) in 1590 with Tokugawa Ieyasu and thereafter served the Tokugawa Shogunate till 1868.
The two families reestablished themselves as a new clan-order in Musashi Region. 
After the Meiji Restoration of 1868, declining the offer from the Meiji Government, it became a private organization to maintain its shinobisamurai traditions.

1582-1833: "Era of Edo Onmitsu Ninshi"

The definition of the Edo Ninshi

The ninshi are the samurai metsuke (inspectors) and samurai onmitsu (undercover agents) who engaged in covert operations for the Edo Tokugawa Shogunate, and those who became key to intelligence activities in Europe as envoys.

In 1582 Shibata Suwo and Nagamochi Tokuzo became retainers of Tokugawa Ieyasu.

In 1584 Nagamochi Tokuzo died in the Battle of Matsugashima Castle. Went to the Castle with Hattori Hanzo and other Igamonos to assist the Oda force, ally of the Tokugawas.

From 1590 the clan heads (Shibata Suwo and Nagamochi Judaiyu) in Edo served in the Edo Castle, as Hiroshikiban to guard the shogun's private quarters in addition to working as onmitsu (undercover agents).

In 1615 Shibata Suwo died in the Summer Seize of Osaka Castle. With two other Igamonos, Suwo was in charge of covert operations in and out of Osaka Castle.

In 1717, the 8th generation Shogun Tokugawa Yoshimune, introduced a new intelligence system, the Oniwabanshu (gardeners), and some of Yoshimune's retainers joined the Hiroshiki Igamono. As a result, the clan became strengthened through marriages with Oniwaban members.

In 1794 the shogunate introduced a meritocracy system based on Gakumon Gimmi (Recruitment examination) which started two years earlier  and opened its offices to talent. The shinobi samurai  started to place importance on academic achievement.

In 1802, under the 11th shogun, the head of the Shibata family, Jinshiro, was transferred to work in the shogunate's Gakumonsho (shogunate university). Jinshiro's son, Junzo was promoted to belong to the Hasei Goemon Group for his academic excellence and served as metsuke.

1853-1868: "Era of Bakumatsu Ninshi"

The most noteworthy contributions to the society made by the members were done during the Bakumatsu period. There are two outstanding Edo ninshi personalities worthy of mention. One is Shibata Takenaka (also known as Shibata Sadataro Takenaka),and the other is Nagamochi Kohjiro Yoshiaki. They were brothers.

Shibata Sadataro Takenaka

He was one of the first Japanese samurai to visit Europe in 1862, then as the first emissary to station in France. (Shibata Mission/Japanese envoy to Europe in 1865).

In 1842 Shibata became metsuke (inspector), and the following year, awarded for his excellence in martial arts and the result in Gakumon Ginmi examination  by the Tokugawa Shogunate.

In 1858 Shibata became chief of staff in the gaikoku bugyo dept. (foreign affairs department). Negotiated the matters regarding the opening of the Port of Yokohama, and finally managed to open the port to the world. Also assumed a leading position to negotiate with the delegations from the States and from Europe.

His first visit to Europe was in 1862 as one of the principal members of the First Japanese Embassy to Europe.  

During the 1862 mission, Shibata was chief of staff and first secretary, and participated directly in the negotiations. 
Also, he was the key person for intelligence gathering in Europe. The newspapers of the time referred to him as "the shadow".

In 1863, he became gaikoku bugyo (commissioner of foreign affairs). His first assignment was to go to Hakodate to negotiate with a Russian consul general Joseph Antonovich Goskevich  regarding the opening of Japanese ports.

In 1865, the Shibata Mission was dispatched to Europe. Shibata stationing in Paris for a year, requested that both the United Kingdom and France send a military mission for training the shogunate soldiers in Western warfare on behalf of the Tokugawa Shogunate. The UK declined, but the French accepted. This led to the first French military mission to Japan from 1867 to 1868, which Shibata organized. Shibata negotiated with the Rothchilds and European companies while conducting reconnaissance work.

Upon returning to Japan, he became in charge of the opening of the Port of Kobe, and had piers, residential areas for foreigners, and Tokugawa-do (Tokugawa Road) constructed. In 1868, he declared the Port of Kobe open to the world in front of foreign delegations.

Nagamochi Kohjiro Yoshiaki

In 1844 Nagamochi passed the Gakumon Ginmmi of the Shogunate. Nagamochi's expertise was in the fields of languages and naval defence. In 1853 serving as metsuke (inspector) he made a reconnaissance, as a Russian frigate "Diana" came in Nagasaki.

In 1854, he was transferred to Nagasaki, as one of the candidates for the captain of Kankohmaru presented by the government of the Netherlands to the Shogunate. Then in 1855, he was appointed as chief of staff at Nagasaki Bugyo Magistrate Office where he established the first language school to teach English in Kyushu.

In October, 1855, visited a Russian admiral, Putyatin, and negotiated on the additional terms of the Russo-Japanese Treaty of Amity and Commerce, and finalized a general agreement except for the attribution of Sakhalin and the handling of indigenous people at Gyokusenji Temple in Shimoda. The construction of Nagasaki Iron Mill started and Nagamochi was appointed to take charge of general affairs accounting.

In 1857, visited Janus Henricus Donker Curtius, the director of the Dutch trading house in Dejima, Nagasaki, and learned the details of the Opium War in China, and reported it to Nagasaki Bugyo Magistrate.
In 1860, reconnaissance work in April, after a Russian Frigate "Posadnik" appeared in Tsushima. Investigating the occupation attempts by the Russian troop from the "Posadnik", Nagamochi negotiated with the Russian captain Nikolai Alekseevich Birilev  to withdraw from Tshushima.(Posadnik Incident)

In 1863, became president of foreign affairs delegation and commander of foot soldiers. In 1864, Transferred to Kyoto as metsuke to be under the direct command of the 15th Shogun, Tokugawa Yoshinobu, to guard the Imperial Palace leading 212 samurai.

On November 9, 1867, Taisei Hokan (大政奉還) (restoration of the government to the crown) took place and the clan became secluded.

After 1868: "Era of modern ninshi"

The Order of Shinobi Samurai has defined the modern ninshi as "a person with expertise, belongs to the organization, finds and assembles information, and works for a common goal while walking the path of Harmony (和)" The order is open to all who can abide by the order creed.

Learned Dutch and accompanied his uncle Shibata Sadataro Takenaka to visit Europe in 1862 as a member of the First Japanese Embassy to Europe.
After returning to Japan he became a French teacher and Japanese Army lieutenant colonel. He was the Japanese father-in-law of a French captain Jules Brunet.
In 1891 became the first president of Tokugawa Ikueikai Ikueigaku school, the predecessor of the present Tokyo University of Agriculture.

In 1917 Shibata Sen' ichi Tatsunojo reformed the order as he joined the Salvation Army. He instructed the order to be a secret society for 50 years after his death.

In 1951 Shibata Jin'ichi Tetsubunsai reorganized the order as Musashi Clan and opened a workshop to teach the shinobi family arts.

In 2006, Jidai Academy was established by the order in Tabata, Tokyo after the 50th memorial of Sen'ichi Tatsunojo. Their family arts were named Musashi-Shibata-ryu.

In 2014 the academy became an LLC Musashi Ichizoku.

In 2017 the Headquarters was moved to Shibakoen, Minato, Tokyo (Japan Society for the Promotion of Machinery Industry Building　機会振興会館)

For decades the order has systematized its traditions, and codified them as the fundamental principles and guidelines.

In 2019 its fundamental philosophy was presented as "The Code of Shinobi Samurai", or "Ninshido"  in the annual congress of the International Ninja Research Association.

In 2019, The Order of Musashi Shinobi Samurai, NPO (Musashi Ninshidan NPO - NPO法人 武蔵忍士団) was founded by Kazuhiro Aizawa, Kiyomi Shibata, and Mayumi Shindo and 7 other members.
The vision of the NPO is a sustainable and peaceful world where every person thrives, and the present purpose of the order is to contribute to the public interest by conducting projects related to promoting culture and international exchange besides its century-old aim of training its members to be full-fledged shinobi.

In the same year the order established its transnational research center with Kenryu Hayek (chief administrator) and Ulises Villa Huesca. The research center fortifies the ninshi think tank by providing information throughout the world. Intelligence gathering has been historically the main mission of the shinobi order. The order advocates Ninshido as a valid framework for today and for the future.

In 2021 an NPO in Europe was established with the name Ninshidan Europe as Sven Kristjan Kreisberg as chairman.

The development of Ninshido

In 2019 an academic presentation titled "Ninshido: The New paradigm of the Order of Shinobi Samurai" was made by Kazuhiro Aizawa and Kiyomi Shibata (The NPO Musashi Order of Shinobi Samurai), at the 4th annual convention of the International Ninja Research Association in Nagano in 2019.

According to Mansenshukai(Bansenshukai), the shinobi's ethics was "seishin" (正心 right-mindedness), which encouraged the shinobi to be loyal to their feudal clients and not to use their arts for themselves. But this was not enough for the shinobsamurai to serve the shogunate, as "seishin" could be used as justifications of arbitrary conducts.　

With the introduction of the Gakumon Ginmi (学問吟味) recruitment exams in 1792 by the shogunate, which required the examinees to study Confucianism and neo-Confucianism. Especially the Neo-Confucianist ideas were combined with the old shinobi mindsets that new ninshi philosophical ideas started to develop emphasizing on Gotoku (五徳 Five Virtues), Gogyo (五行 Five Elements), and Sansai (三才 Three Powers). This took place before the introduction of Bushido by Nitobe Inazo.

In 1989, the fundamental philosophy was named Kyohmei (共鳴 Empathetic Resonance) and Mizu kagami (水鏡 Water Mirror), and the ultimate purpose of the members training was to be one with ku (空 large universe) or “無我 no-self.

The order maintains that ninshido has evolved and has adapted to changes that the ninshi traditions have survived to this date. The ninishido ideas have been incorporated in the order's practical educational system so the members can learn a collection of strategies called "Gorin ninpo" (五輪忍法) and the "Kyohmei" guideline" to serve their communities as shinobi should. Through training, the members efficiently learn to integrate their mental and physical strengths, which will cultivate their inner fortitude to be equanimous under any circumstance.

The ninshi education helps to develop a more positive shinobi paradigm in the world as well as to help mold members personalities. The timeless ninshi wisdom can be effectively utilized in this modern age.

Activity

2007-2017 Establishment of a martial arts dojo "Jidai Academy" in Tabata

2017–present Management of a Martial arts dojo "Shinobi Samurai Honjin Dojo" in Shibakoen

The order has become a small think and do tank following the footsteps of the ninshi forefathers to work for world peace. This organization provides the public with seminars, workshops, events for the purpose of promoting culture, international exchange, tourism, etc., and with projects related to information gathering.

2019 Published an academic textbook for interpreter-students featuring the memory training used in shinobi training of the order.

The Creed
  1. Keep a water mirror in your heart and resonate with others with compassion
 2. Be unwavering and harmonious; conquer anger and persevere in tribulation.
 3. Understand the laws of nature and make use of opportunities, and survive to fulfill your mission.
 4. Take the facts to heart: The fundamental duties of shinobi are gathering intelligence, and guarding confidentiality. 
 5. Observe and act with no sound, no scent, and expect no recognition.

Densho Scroll, Menkyo, Kuden
Densho (伝書）usually takes a form of "makimono" (巻物 scroll) where the teaching and knowledge of the school are written and/or drawn.

Menkyo (免許) means "license". It refers to the license to teach used by practitioners of Japanese classical arts and martial arts certifying some license within the school or ryū.

Upon receiving a menkyo each practitioner swears not to reveal the secret arts and signs it.

Kuden (口伝) is a method of orally transmitting information. Especially in weapon crafting, the techniques are shown, and explained orally from masters to students.

Den'i (伝位) Ranks by Scroll Titles
 Kirigami: entry level. After learning five basic principles. 
 Mokuroku: certificate, and entered into official rolls.
 Makimono: Scroll, Menkyo: License.
 Shoden:experience: 3–5 years.
 Chuden:experience: over 5 years.
 Okuden Menkyo:experience: over 10 years.
 Menkyo Kaiden:private instruction from the grandmaster  (1 hour x 8 times)
 Gokuden:Honorary licence to a holder of Menkyo Kaiden.

Recently dan-kyu system has been added for interpreter ranking

See also 
 French–Japanese relations
 Clan
 Shinobi
 Ninja

References

External links 
近代デジタルライブラリー(国立国会図書館)National Diet Library Digital Collections
(『徳川実紀』、経済雑誌社校，経済雑誌社, 明37-40 "Tokugawa Jikki" Keizai Jasshisha.co. : [ Vol.1]、[ Vol.2]、[ Vol.3]、[ Vol.4]、[ Vol.5]、[ Vol.6]、[ Vol.7])
(『続徳川実紀』、経済雑誌社校，経済雑誌社, 明38-40  "Tokugawa Jikki" Keizai Jasshisha.co.: [ Vol.1]、[ Vol.2]、[ Vol.3]、[ Vol.4]、[ Vol.5])
「現代語訳家康公伝」の構成"Biography of Ieyasu, translated into modern Japanese"
[日野清三郎著、長正統編『幕末における対馬と英露』(東京大学出版会,1968年)https://iss.ndl.go.jp/books/R100000002-I000001216560-00]
[郡山良光『幕末日露関係史研究』(国書刊行会,1980年) https://iss.ndl.go.jp/books/R000000004-I2385346-00?locale=en]
NPO法人 武蔵忍士団
Musashi Ninja Clan, The Ninshidan Transnational Research Center
忍士道武芸連盟 Ninshido Bugei Federation

Japanese diplomats
France–Japan relations
Members of the First Japanese Embassy to Europe
Samurai
Ninjutsu organizations